The 2014–15 North Caledonian Football League was competed for by six clubs playing ten matches each (a total of 30 league matches).  The championship was won by Golspie Sutherland.  As the remaining senior league in Scottish football yet to have been integrated into the pyramid system, there was no possible promotion available for the victor.

Teams

League table

References

North Caledonian Football League seasons

5